Cave Springs High School is an American high school for grades 9–12 in Bunch, Adair County, Oklahoma. In 2006 it had an enrollment of 129. It is the only high school in the Cave Springs School District.

External links 
 Cave Springs School District
 School Profile

Public high schools in Oklahoma
Schools in Adair County, Oklahoma